Empathy is the capacity to understand or feel what another person is experiencing from within their frame of reference, that is, the capacity to place oneself in another's position. Definitions of empathy encompass a broad range of social, cognitive, and emotional processes primarily concerned with understanding others (and others' emotions in particular). Types of empathy include cognitive empathy, emotional (or affective) empathy, somatic empathy, and spiritual empathy.

Etymology 

The English word empathy is derived from the Ancient Greek  (empatheia, meaning "physical affection or passion"). Theodor Lipps adapted the German aesthetic term  ("feeling into") to psychology in 1903, and Edward B. Titchener translated  into English as "empathy" in 1909. In modern Greek  may mean, depending on context, prejudice, malevolence, malice, or hatred.

Definitions

General
Since its introduction into the English language, empathy has had a wide range of (sometimes conflicting) definitions among both researchers and laypeople. Empathy definitions encompass a broad range of phenomena, including caring for other people and having a desire to help them; experiencing emotions that match another person's emotions; discerning what another person is thinking or feeling; and making less distinct the differences between the self and the other.

Since empathy involves understanding the emotional states of other people, the way it is characterized derives from the way emotions are characterized. For example, if emotions are characterized by bodily feelings, then understanding the bodily feelings of another will be considered central to empathy. On the other hand, if emotions are characterized by a combination of beliefs and desires, then understanding those beliefs and desires will be more essential to empathy. The ability to imagine oneself as another person is a sophisticated process. However, the basic capacity to recognize emotions in others may be innate and may be achieved unconsciously. Empirical research supports a variety of interventions to improve empathy.

Empathy is not all-or-nothing; rather, a person can be more or less empathic toward another. Paradigmatically, a person exhibits empathy when they communicate an accurate recognition of the significance of another person's ongoing intentional actions, associated emotional states, and personal characteristics in a manner that seems accurate and tolerable to the recognized person.

One's ability to recognize the bodily feelings of another is related to one's imitative capacities, and seems to be grounded in an innate capacity to associate the bodily movements and facial expressions one sees in another with the proprioceptive feelings of producing those corresponding movements or expressions oneself.

Distinctions between empathy and related concepts 
Compassion and sympathy are terms associated with empathy. A person feels compassion when they notice others are in need, and this feeling motivates that person to help. Like empathy, compassion has a wide range of definitions and purported facets (which overlap with some definitions of empathy). Sympathy is a feeling of care and understanding for someone in need. Some include in sympathy an empathic concern for another person, and the wish to see them better off or happier.

Empathy is also related to pity and emotional contagion. One feels pity towards others who might be in trouble or in need of help. This feeling is described as "feeling sorry" for someone. Emotional contagion is when a person (especially an infant or a member of a mob) imitatively "catches" the emotions that others are showing without necessarily recognizing this is happening.

Alexithymia describes a deficiency in understanding, processing, or describing one's own emotions (unlike empathy which is about someone else's emotions).

Classification 
Empathy has two major components:

 , also called emotional empathy, is the ability to respond with an appropriate emotion to another's mental states. Our ability to empathize emotionally is based on emotional contagion: being affected by another's emotional or arousal state. Affective empathy can be subdivided into the following scales:
 Empathic concern: sympathy and compassion for others in response to their suffering.
 Personal distress: feelings of discomfort and anxiety in response to another's suffering. There is no consensus regarding whether personal distress is a form of empathy or instead is something distinct from empathy. There may be a developmental aspect to this subdivision. Infants respond to the distress of others by getting distressed themselves; only when they are two years old do they start to respond in other-oriented ways: trying to help, comfort, and share.
  is the ability to understand another's perspective or mental state. The terms empathic accuracy, social cognition, perspective-taking, theory of mind, and mentalizing are often used synonymously, but due to a lack of studies comparing theory of mind with types of empathy, it is unclear whether these are equivalent. Although measures of cognitive empathy include self-report questionnaires and behavioral measures, a 2019 meta-analysis found only a negligible association between self-report and behavioral measures, suggesting that people are generally not able to accurately assess their own cognitive empathy abilities. Cognitive empathy can be subdivided into the following scales:
 Perspective-taking: the tendency to spontaneously adopt others' psychological perspectives.
 Fantasy: the tendency to identify with fictional characters.
 Tactical (or strategic) empathy: the deliberate use of perspective-taking to achieve certain desired ends.

The scientific community has not coalesced around a precise definition of these constructs, but there is consensus about this distinction. Affective and cognitive empathy are also independent from one another; someone who strongly empathizes emotionally is not necessarily good in understanding another's perspective.

Development

Evolution across species 
Studies in animal behavior and neuroscience indicate that empathy is not restricted to humans (however the interpretation of such research depends in part on how expansive a definition of empathy researchers adopt).

Empathy-like behaviors have been observed in primates, both in captivity and in the wild, and in particular in bonobos, perhaps the most empathic primate.

One study demonstrated prosocial behavior elicited by empathy in rodents. Rodents demonstrate empathy for cagemates (but not strangers) in pain. An influential study on the evolution of empathy by Stephanie Preston and Frans de Waal discusses a neural perception-action mechanism and postulates a bottom-up model of empathy that ties together all levels, from state matching to perspective-taking.

University of Chicago neurobiologist Jean Decety agrees that empathy is not exclusive to humans, but that empathy has deep evolutionary, biochemical, and neurological underpinnings, and that even the most advanced forms of empathy in humans are built on more basic forms and remain connected to core mechanisms associated with affective communication, social attachment, and parental care. Neural circuits involved in empathy and caring include the brainstem, the amygdala, hypothalamus, basal ganglia, insula, and orbitofrontal cortex.

Ontogenetic development 
By the age of two, children normally begin to exhibit fundamental behaviors of empathy by having an emotional response that corresponds with another person's emotional state. Even earlier, at one year of age, infants have some rudiments of empathy; they understand that, as with their own actions, other people's actions have goals. Toddlers sometimes comfort others or show concern for them. During their second year, they play games of falsehood or pretend in an effort to fool others. Such actions require that the child knows what others believe in order that the child can manipulate those beliefs.

According to researchers at the University of Chicago who used functional magnetic resonance imaging (fMRI), children between the ages of seven and twelve experience brain activity when seeing others be injured similar to the brain activity that would occur if the child themself had been injured. Their findings are consistent with previous fMRI studies of pain empathy with adults, and previous findings that vicarious experiencing, particularly of others' distress, is hardwired and present early in life. The research found additional areas of the brain, associated with social and moral cognition, were activated when young people saw another person intentionally hurt by somebody, including regions involved in moral reasoning.

Although children are capable of showing some signs of empathy, including attempting to comfort a crying baby, from as early as 18 months to two years, most do not demonstrate a full theory of mind until around the age of four. Theory of mind involves the ability to understand that other people may have beliefs that are different from one's own, and is thought to involve the cognitive component of empathy. Children usually can pass false-belief tasks (a test for a theory of mind) around the age of four. It is theorised that people with autism find using a theory of mind to be very difficult (e.g. the Sally–Anne test).

Empathic maturity is a cognitive-structural theory developed at the Yale University School of Nursing. It addresses how adults conceive or understand the personhood of patients. The theory, first applied to nurses and since applied to other professions, postulates three levels of cognitive structures. The third and highest level is a meta-ethical theory of the moral structure of care. Adults who operate with level-III understanding synthesize systems of justice and care-based ethics.

Individual differences 
The Empathic Concern scale assesses other-oriented feelings of sympathy and concern and the Personal Distress scale measures self-oriented feelings of personal anxiety and unease. Researchers have used behavioral and neuroimaging data to analyze extraversion and agreeableness (the Warmth-Altruistic personality profile). Both are associated with empathic accuracy and increased brain activity in two brain regions that are important for empathic processing (medial prefrontal cortex and temporoparietal junction).

Sex differences 

On average, females score higher than males on measures of empathy, such as the Empathy Quotient (EQ), while males tend to score higher on the Systemizing Quotient (SQ). Both males and females with autistic spectrum disorders usually score lower on the EQ and higher on SQ (see below for more detail on autism and empathy).

Other studies show no significant sex differences, and instead suggest that gender differences are the result of motivational differences, such as upholding stereotypes. Gender stereotypes about men and women can affect how they express emotions. The sex difference is small to moderate, somewhat inconsistent, and is often influenced by the person's motivations or social environment. Bosson et al. say "physiological measures of emotion and studies that track people in their daily lives find no consistent sex differences in the experience of emotion," which "suggests that women may amplify certain emotional expressions, or men may suppress them." However, a 2014 review from Neuroscience & Biobehavioral Reviews reported that there is evidence that "sex differences in empathy have phylogenetic and ontogenetic roots in biology and are not merely cultural byproducts driven by socialization."

A review published in Neuropsychologia found that females tended to be better at recognizing facial affects, expression processing, and emotions in general. Males tended to be better at recognizing specific behaviors such as anger, aggression, and threatening cues. A 2014 meta-analysis, in Cognition and Emotion, found a small female advantage in non-verbal emotional recognition.

The 2014 Neuroscience & Biobehavioral Reviews analysis found sex differences in empathy from birth, growing larger with age, and consistent and stable across lifespan. Females, on average, had higher empathy than males, while children with higher empathy, regardless of gender, continue to be higher in empathy throughout development. Analysis of brain event-related potentials found that females who saw human suffering tended to have higher ERP waveforms than males. An investigation of N400 amplitudes found, on average, higher N400 in females in response to social situations which positively correlated with self-reported empathy. Structural fMRI studies also found females to have larger grey matter volumes in posterior inferior frontal and anterior inferior parietal cortex areas which are correlated with mirror neurons in fMRI literature. Females also tended to have a stronger link between emotional and cognitive empathy. The researchers believe that the stability of these sex differences in development are unlikely to be explained by environmental influences but rather by human evolution and inheritance. Throughout prehistory, women were the primary nurturers and caretakers of children; so this might have led to an evolved neurological adaptation for women to be more aware and responsive to non-verbal expressions. According to the "Primary Caretaker Hypothesis", prehistoric men did not have such selective pressure as primary caretakers. This might explain modern day sex differences in emotion recognition and empathy.

Environmental influences 
Some research theorizes that environmental factors, such as parenting style and relationships, affect the development of empathy in children. Empathy promotes pro-social relationships and helps mediate aggression.

Caroline Tisot studied how environmental factors like parenting style, parent empathy, and prior social experiences affect the development of empathy in young children. The children studied were asked to complete an effective empathy measure, while the children's parents completed a questionnaire to assess parenting style and the Balanced Emotional Empathy scale. The study found that certain parenting practices, as opposed to parenting style as a whole, contributed to the development of empathy in children. These practices include encouraging the child to imagine the perspectives of others and teaching the child to reflect on his or her own feelings. The development of empathy varied based on the gender of the child and parent. Paternal warmth was significantly positively related to empathy in children, especially boys. Maternal warmth was negatively related to empathy in children, especially girls.

Empathy may be disrupted due to brain trauma such as stroke. In most cases, empathy is impaired if a lesion or stroke occurs on the right side of the brain. Damage to the frontal lobe, which is primarily responsible for emotional regulation, can profoundly impact a person's capacity to experience empathy. People with an acquired brain injury also show lower levels of empathy. More than half of those people with a traumatic brain injury self-report a deficit in their empathic capacity.

Empathic anger and distress

Anger 
Empathic anger is an emotion, a form of empathic distress. Empathic anger is felt in a situation where someone else is being hurt by another person or thing.

Empathic anger affects desires to help and to punish. Two sub-categories of empathic anger are state empathic anger (current empathic anger) and trait empathic anger (tendency or predisposition to experience empathic anger).

The higher a person's perspective-taking ability, the less angry they are in response to a provocation. Empathic concern does not, however, significantly predict anger response, and higher personal distress is associated with increased anger.

Distress 

Empathic distress is feeling the perceived pain of another person. This feeling can be transformed into empathic anger, feelings of injustice, or guilt. These emotions can be perceived as pro-social; however, views differ as to whether they serve as motives for moral behavior.

Influence on helping behavior 

Investigators into the social response to natural disasters researched the characteristics associated with individuals who help victims. Researchers found that cognitive empathy, rather than emotional empathy, predicted helping behavior towards victims. Taking on the perspectives of others (cognitive empathy) may allow these helpers to better empathize with victims without as much discomfort, whereas sharing the emotions of the victims (emotional empathy) can cause emotional distress, helplessness, and victim-blaming, and may lead to avoidance rather than helping.

Individuals who expressed concern for the vulnerable (i.e. affective empathy) were more willing to accept the COVID-19 pandemic lockdown measures that create distress. Knowledge of how empathic feelings evoke altruistic motivation may lead people to adopt strategies for suppressing or avoiding such feelings. Such numbing, or loss of the capacity to feel empathy for clients, is a possible factor in the experience of burnout among case workers in helping professions. People can better cognitively control their actions the more they understand how altruistic behavior emerges, whether it is from minimizing sadness or the arousal of mirror neurons. Empathy-induced altruism may not always produce pro-social effects. For example, it could lead one to exert oneself on behalf of those for whom empathy is felt at the expense of other potential pro-social goals, thus inducing a type of bias. Researchers suggest that individuals are willing to act against the greater collective good or to violate their own moral principles of fairness and justice if doing so will benefit a person for whom empathy is felt.

Empathy-based socialization differs from inhibition of egoistic impulses through shaping, modeling, and internalized guilt. Therapeutic programs to foster altruistic impulses by encouraging perspective-taking and empathic feelings might enable individuals to develop more satisfactory interpersonal relations, especially in the long-term. Empathy-induced altruism can improve attitudes toward stigmatized groups, and to improve racial attitudes, and actions toward people with AIDS, the homeless, and convicts. Such resulting altruism also increases cooperation in competitive situations.

Genetics

General
Measures of empathy show evidence of being genetically influenced. For example, carriers of the deletion variant of ADRA2B show more activation of the amygdala when viewing emotionally arousing images. The gene 5-HTTLPR seems to influence sensitivity to negative emotional information and is also attenuated by the deletion variant of ADRA2b. Carriers of the double G variant of the OXTR gene have better social skills and higher self-esteem. A gene located near LRRN1 on chromosome 3 influences the human ability to read, understand, and respond to emotions in others.

Neuroscientific basis of empathy 
Contemporary neuroscience offers insights into the neural basis of the mind's ability to understand and process emotion. Studies of mirror neurons attempt to measure the neural basis for human mind-reading and emotion-sharing abilities and thereby to explain the basis of the empathy reaction. People who score high on empathy tests have especially busy mirror neuron systems. Empathy is a spontaneous sharing of affect, provoked by witnessing and sympathizing with another's emotional state. The empathic person mirrors or mimics the emotional response they would expect to feel if they were in the other person's place. Unlike personal distress, empathy is not characterized by aversion to another's emotional response. This distinction is vital because empathy is associated with the moral emotion sympathy, or empathic concern, and consequently also prosocial or altruistic action.

A person empathizes by feeling what they believe to be the emotions of another, which makes empathy both affective and cognitive. For social beings, negotiating interpersonal decisions is as important to survival as being able to navigate the physical landscape.

Meta-analysis studies of functional magnetic resonance imaging (fMRI) studies of empathy confirm that different brain areas are activated during affective-perceptual empathy than during cognitive-evaluative empathy. Affective empathy is correlated with increased activity in the insula while cognitive empathy is correlated with activity in the mid cingulate cortex and adjacent dorsomedial prefrontal cortex. A study with patients who experienced different types of brain damage confirmed the distinction between emotional and cognitive empathy. Specifically, the inferior frontal gyrus appears to be responsible for emotional empathy, and the ventromedial prefrontal gyrus seems to mediate cognitive empathy.

fMRI has been employed to investigate the functional anatomy of empathy. Observing another person's emotional state activates parts of the neuronal network that are involved in processing that same state in oneself, whether it is disgust, touch, or pain.

The study of the neural underpinnings of empathy received increased interest following a paper published by S.D. Preston and Frans de Waal after the discovery of mirror neurons in monkeys that fire both when the creature watches another perform an action as well as when they themselves perform it. Researchers suggest that paying attention to perceiving another individual's state activates neural representations, and that this activation primes or generates the associated autonomic and somatic responses (perception-action coupling), unless inhibited. This mechanism resembles the common coding theory between perception and action. Another study provides evidence of separate neural pathways activating reciprocal suppression in different regions of the brain associated with the performance of "social" and "mechanical" tasks. These findings suggest that the cognition associated with reasoning about the "state of another person's mind" and "causal/mechanical properties of inanimate objects" are neurally suppressed from occurring at the same time.

Mirroring-behavior in motor neurons during empathy may help duplicate feelings. Such sympathetic action may afford access to sympathetic feelings and, perhaps, trigger emotions of kindness and forgiveness.

Impairment 
A difference in distribution between affective and cognitive empathy has been observed in various conditions. Psychopathy and narcissism are associated with impairments in affective but not cognitive empathy, whereas bipolar disorder is associated with deficits in cognitive but not affective empathy. People with Borderline personality disorder may suffer from impairments in cognitive empathy as well as fluctuating affective empathy, although this topic is controversial.  Autism spectrum disorders are associated with various combinations, including deficits in cognitive empathy as well as deficits in both cognitive and affective empathy. Schizophrenia, too, is associated with deficits in both types of empathy. However, even in people without conditions such as these, the balance between affective and cognitive empathy varies.

Atypical empathic responses are associated with autism and particular personality disorders such as psychopathy, borderline, narcissistic, and schizoid personality disorders; conduct disorder; schizophrenia; bipolar disorder; and depersonalization. Sex offenders who had been raised in an environment where they were shown a lack of empathy and had endured abuse of the sort they later committed, felt less affective empathy for their victims.

Autism 
The interaction between empathy and autism is a complex and ongoing field of research. Several different factors are proposed to be at play.

A study of high-functioning adults with autistic spectrum disorders found an increased prevalence of alexithymia, a personality construct characterized by the inability to recognize and articulate emotional arousal in oneself or others. Some fMRI research indicates that alexithymia contributes to a lack of empathy. The lack of empathic attunement inherent to alexithymic states may reduce quality and satisfaction of relationships. Empathy deficits associated with the autism spectrum may be due to significant comorbidity between alexithymia and autism spectrum conditions rather than a result of social impairment.

Relative to typically developing children, high-functioning autistic children showed reduced mirror neuron activity in the brain's inferior frontal gyrus (pars opercularis) while imitating and observing emotional expressions in neurotypical children. EEG evidence revealed significantly greater mu suppression in the sensorimotor cortex of autistic individuals. Activity in this area was inversely related to symptom severity in the social domain, suggesting that a dysfunctional mirror neuron system may underlie social and communication deficits observed in autism, including impaired theory of mind and cognitive empathy. The mirror neuron system is essential for emotional empathy.

Studies have suggested that autistic individuals have an impaired theory of mind. Theory of mind relies on structures of the temporal lobe and the pre-frontal cortex; empathy relies on the sensorimotor cortices as well as limbic and para-limbic structures. The lack of clear distinctions between theory of mind and cognitive empathy may have caused an incomplete understanding of the empathic abilities of those with Asperger syndrome; many reports on the empathic deficits of individuals with Asperger syndrome are actually based on impairments in theory of mind. Although autistic people have difficulties in recognizing and articulating emotions, some studies have reported that while they may lack cognitive empathy (the ability to assume another's emotions), they have higher than average levels of affective empathy (feeling the emotions that another is feeling, once they are known).

Individuals on the autistic spectrum self-report lower levels of empathic concern, show less or absent comforting responses toward someone who is suffering, and report equal or higher levels of personal distress compared to controls. The combination of reduced empathic concern and increased personal distress may lead to the overall reduction in empathy. Professor Simon Baron-Cohen suggests that those with classic autism often lack both cognitive and affective empathy. However, other research found no evidence of impairment in autistic individuals' ability to understand other people's basic intentions or goals; instead, data suggests that impairments are found in understanding more complex social emotions or in considering others' viewpoints. People with Asperger syndrome may have problems understanding others' perspectives in terms of theory of mind, but the average person with the condition demonstrates equal empathic concern as, and higher personal distress than, controls. The existence of individuals with heightened personal distress on the autism spectrum is a possible explanation for why some people with autism appear to have heightened emotional empathy. Although increased personal distress may be an effect of heightened egocentrism, emotional empathy depends on mirror neuron activity (which, as described previously, has been found to be reduced in those with autism), and empathy in people on the autism spectrum is generally reduced. Empathy deficits present in autism spectrum disorders may be more indicative of impairments in the ability to take the perspective of others, while the empathy deficits in psychopathy may be more indicative of impairments in responsiveness to others' emotions. These "disorders of empathy" further highlight the importance of the ability to empathize, by the way they illustrate some of the consequences of disrupted empathy development.

The empathizing–systemizing theory (E-S) classifies people by testing their capabilities along two independent dimensions—empathizing (E) and systemizing (S)—to establish their Empathy Quotient (EQ) and Systemizing Quotient (SQ). Five "brain types" can be distinguished based on such scores, which are theorized to correlate with differences at the neural level. In E-S theory, autism and Asperger syndrome are associated with below-average empathy and average or above-average systemizing. The E-S theory has been extended into the Extreme Male Brain theory, which suggests that people with an autism spectrum condition are more likely to have an "Extreme Type S" brain type, corresponding with above-average systemizing but challenged empathy.

The extreme male brain (EMB) theory proposes that individuals on the autistic spectrum are characterized by impairments in empathy due to sex differences in the brain: specifically, people with autism spectrum conditions show an exaggerated male profile. Some aspects of autistic neuroanatomy seem to be extrapolations of typical male neuroanatomy, which may be influenced by elevated levels of fetal testosterone rather than gender itself.

The double empathy problem theory proposes that prior studies on autism and empathy may have been misinterpreted and that autistic people show the same levels of cognitive empathy towards one another as non-autistic people do.

Psychopathy 
Psychopathy is a personality disorder partly characterized by antisocial and aggressive behaviors, as well as emotional and interpersonal deficits including shallow emotions and a lack of remorse and empathy. The Diagnostic and Statistical Manual of Mental Disorders (DSM) and International Classification of Diseases (ICD) list antisocial personality disorder (ASPD) and dissocial personality disorder, stating that these have been referred to as or include what is referred to as psychopathy.

Psychopathy is associated with atypical responses to distress cues (e.g. facial and vocal expressions of fear and sadness), including decreased activation of the fusiform and extrastriate cortical regions, which may partly account for impaired recognition of and reduced autonomic responsiveness to expressions of fear, and impairments of empathy. Studies on children with psychopathic tendencies have also shown such associations. The underlying  for processing expressions of happiness are functionally intact in psychopaths, although less responsive than in those of controls. The neuroimaging literature is unclear as to whether deficits are specific to particular emotions such as fear. Some fMRI studies report that emotion perception deficits in psychopathy are pervasive across emotions (positives and negatives).

One study on psychopaths found that, under certain circumstances, they could willfully empathize with others, and that their empathic reaction initiated the same way it does for controls. Psychopathic criminals were brain-scanned while watching videos of a person harming another individual. The psychopaths' empathic reaction initiated the same way it did for controls when they were instructed to empathize with the harmed individual, and the area of the brain relating to pain was activated when the psychopaths were asked to imagine how the harmed individual felt. The research suggests psychopaths can switch empathy on at will, which would enable them to be both callous and charming. The team who conducted the study say they do not know how to transform this willful empathy into the spontaneous empathy most people have, though they propose it might be possible to rehabilitate psychopaths by helping them to activate their "empathy switch". Others suggested that it remains unclear whether psychopaths' experience of empathy was the same as that of controls, and also questioned the possibility of devising therapeutic interventions that would make the empathic reactions more automatic.

One problem with the theory that the ability to turn empathy on and off constitutes psychopathy is that such a theory would classify socially sanctioned violence and punishment as psychopathy, as these entail suspending empathy towards certain individuals and/or groups. The attempt to get around this by standardizing tests of psychopathy for cultures with different norms of punishment is criticized in this context for being based on the assumption that people can be classified in discrete cultures while cultural influences are in reality mixed and every person encounters a mosaic of influences. Psychopathy may be an artefact of psychiatry's standardization along imaginary sharp lines between cultures, as opposed to an actual difference in the brain.

Work conducted by Professor Jean Decety with large samples of incarcerated psychopaths offers additional insights. In one study, psychopaths were scanned while viewing video clips depicting people being intentionally hurt. They were also tested on their responses to seeing short videos of facial expressions of pain. The participants in the high-psychopathy group exhibited significantly less activation in the ventromedial prefrontal cortex, amygdala, and periaqueductal gray parts of the brain, but more activity in the striatum and the insula when compared to control participants. In a second study, individuals with psychopathy exhibited a strong response in pain-affective brain regions when taking an imagine-self perspective, but failed to recruit the neural circuits that were activated in controls during an imagine-other perspective—in particular the ventromedial prefrontal cortex and amygdala—which may contribute to their lack of empathic concern.

Researchers have investigated whether people who have high levels of psychopathy have sufficient levels of cognitive empathy but lack the ability to use affective empathy. People who score highly on psychopathy measures are less likely to exhibit affective empathy. There was a strong negative correlation, showing that psychopathy and lack of affective empathy correspond strongly.  found those who scored highly on the psychopathy scale do not lack in recognising emotion in facial expressions. Therefore, such individuals do not lack in perspective-talking ability but do lack in compassion .

In fact, in an experiment published in March 2007 at the University of Southern California neuroscientist Antonio R. Damasio and his colleagues showed that subjects with damage to the ventromedial prefrontal cortex lack the ability to empathically feel their way to moral answers, and that when confronted with moral dilemmas, these brain-damaged patients coldly came up with "end-justifies-the-means" answers, leading Damasio to conclude that the point was not that they reached immoral conclusions, but that when they were confronted by a difficult issue – in this case as whether to shoot down a passenger plane hijacked by terrorists before it hits a major city – these patients appear to reach decisions without the anguish that afflicts those with normally functioning brains. According to Adrian Raine, a clinical neuroscientist also at the University of Southern California, one of this study's implications is that society may have to rethink how it judges immoral people: "Psychopaths often feel no empathy or remorse. Without that awareness, people relying exclusively on reasoning seem to find it harder to sort their way through moral thickets. Does that mean they should be held to different standards of accountability?"

Despite studies suggesting psychopaths have deficits in emotion perception and imagining others in pain, professor Simon Baron-Cohen claims psychopathy is associated with intact cognitive empathy, which would imply an intact ability to read and respond to behaviors, social cues, and what others are feeling. Psychopathy is, however, associated with impairment in the other major component of empathy—affective (emotional) empathy—which includes the ability to feel the suffering and emotions of others (emotional contagion), and those with the condition are therefore not distressed by the suffering of their victims. Such a dissociation of affective and cognitive empathy has been demonstrated for aggressive offenders.

Other conditions 
Atypical empathic responses are also correlated with a variety of other conditions.

Borderline personality disorder is characterized by extensive behavioral and interpersonal difficulties that arise from emotional and cognitive dysfunction. Dysfunctional social and interpersonal behavior plays a role in the emotionally intense way people with borderline personality disorder react. While individuals with borderline personality disorder may show their emotions excessively, their ability to feel empathy is a topic of much dispute with contradictory findings. Some studies assert impairments in cognitive empathy in BPD patients yet no affective empathy impairments, whilst other studies have found impairments in both affective and cognitive empathy. Fluctuating empathy, fluctuating between normal range of empathy, reduced sense of empathy and a lack of empathy has been noted to be present in BPD patients in multiple studies, although more research is needed to determine its prevalence, although it is believed to be at least not uncommon and may be a very common phenomenon. It must be noted that BPD is a very heterogenous disorder, with symptoms including empathy ranging wildly between patients.

One diagnostic criterion of narcissistic personality disorder is a lack of empathy and an unwillingness or inability to recognize or identify with the feelings and needs of others.

Characteristics of schizoid personality disorder include emotional coldness, detachment, and impaired affect corresponding with an inability to be empathic and sensitive towards others.

A study conducted by Jean Decety and colleagues at the University of Chicago demonstrated that subjects with aggressive conduct disorder demonstrate atypical empathic responses when viewing others in pain. Subjects with conduct disorder were at least as responsive as controls to the pain of others but, unlike controls, subjects with conduct disorder showed strong and specific activation of the amygdala and ventral striatum (areas that enable a general arousing effect of reward), yet impaired activation of the neural regions involved in self-regulation and metacognition (including moral reasoning), in addition to diminished processing between the amygdala and the prefrontal cortex.

Schizophrenia is characterized by impaired affective empathy, as well as severe cognitive and empathy impairments as measured by the Empathy Quotient (EQ). These empathy impairments are also associated with impairments in social cognitive tasks.

Bipolar individuals have impaired cognitive empathy and theory of mind, but increased affective empathy. Despite cognitive flexibility being impaired, planning behavior is intact. Dysfunctions in the prefrontal cortex could result in the impaired cognitive empathy, since impaired cognitive empathy has been related with neurocognitive task performance involving cognitive flexibility.

Dave Grossman, in his book On Killing, reports on how military training artificially creates depersonalization in soldiers, suppressing empathy and making it easier for them to kill other human beings.

A deadening of empathic response to workmates, customers and the like is one of the three key components of occupational burnout, according to the conceptualisation behind its primary diagnostic instrument, the Maslach Burnout Inventory (MBI).

The term Empathy Deficit Disorder (EDD) has gained popularity online, but it is not a diagnosis under the DSM-5. The term was coined in an article by Douglas LaBier, PhD. In the article, he acknowledges that he "made it up, so you won't find it listed in the American Psychiatric Association's Diagnostic and Statistical Manual of Mental Disorders" and that his conclusions are derived from personal experience alone. His conclusions have not been validated through clinical studies, nor have studies identified EDD as a separate disorder rather than a symptom associated with previously established diagnoses that do appear in the DSM-5.

In educational contexts 
Another growing focus of investigation is how empathy manifests in education between teachers and learners. Although there is general agreement that empathy is essential in educational settings, research has found that it is difficult to develop empathy in trainee teachers.

Learning by teaching (LbT) is one method used to teach empathy. Students transmit new content to their classmates, so they have to reflect continuously on those classmates' mental processes. This develops the students' feeling for group reactions and networking. Carl R. Rogers pioneered research in effective psychotherapy and teaching which espoused that empathy coupled with unconditional positive regard or caring for students and authenticity or congruence were the most important traits for a therapist or teacher to have. Other research and meta-analyses corroborated the importance of these person-centered traits.

In intercultural contexts 

According to one theory, empathy is one of seven components involved in the effectiveness of intercultural communication. This theory also states that empathy is learnable. However, research also shows that people experience more difficulty empathizing with others who are different from them in characteristics such as status, culture, religion, language, skin colour, gender, and age.

To build intercultural empathy in others, psychologists employ empathy training. US researchers William Weeks, Paul Pedersen, et al. state that people who develop intercultural empathy can interpret experiences or perspectives from more than one worldview. Intercultural empathy can also improve self-awareness and critical awareness of one's own interaction style as conditioned by one's cultural views and promote a view of self-as-process.
An alternative European approach to intercultural leadership considers four main dimensions: Cognitive Leadership, Affective Leadership, Relational leadership, and Emotional Leadership.

Practical issues 
The capacity to empathize is a revered trait in society. Empathy is considered a motivating factor for unselfish, prosocial behavior, whereas a lack of empathy is related to antisocial behavior.

Apart from the automatic tendency to recognize the emotions of others, one may also deliberately engage in empathic reasoning. Such empathic engagement helps an individual understand and anticipate the behavior of another. Two general methods have been identified: An individual may mentally simulate fictitious versions of the beliefs, desires, character traits, and context of another individual to see what emotional feelings this provokes. Or, an individual may simulate an emotional feeling and then analyze the environment to discover a suitable reason for the emotional feeling to be appropriate for that specific environment.

An empathizer's own emotional background may affect or distort how they perceive the emotions in others. Societies that promote individualism have lower ability for empathy. The judgments that empathy provides about the emotional states of others are not certain ones.

Empathizers report finding it easier to take the perspective of another person in a situation when they have experienced a similar situation, and that they experience greater empathic understanding. Research regarding whether similar past experience makes the empathizer more accurate is mixed.

The extent to which a person's emotions are publicly observable, or mutually recognized as such has significant social consequences. Empathic recognition may or may not be welcomed or socially desirable. This is particularly the case when we recognize the emotions that someone has towards us during real time interactions. Based on a metaphorical affinity with touch, philosopher Edith Wyschogrod claims that the proximity entailed by empathy increases the potential vulnerability of either party.

Problems created by too much empathy and empathic bias 

Some research suggests that people are more able and willing to empathize with those most similar to themselves. In particular, empathy increases with similarities in culture and living conditions. Empathy is more likely to occur between individuals whose interaction is more frequent.  In one experiment, researchers gave two groups of men wristbands according to which football team they supported. Each participant received a mild electric shock, then watched another go through the same pain. When the wristbands matched, both : with pain, and empathic pain. If they supported opposing teams, the observer was found to have little empathy.

Psychologist Paul Bloom, author of Against Empathy, points out that this bias can result in tribalism and violent responses in the name of helping people of the same "tribe" or social group, for example when empathic bias is exploited by demagogues. He proposes "rational compassion" as an alternative; one example is using effective altruism to decide on charitable donations rationally, rather than by relying on emotional responses to images in the media. Empathy can also be exploited by sympathetic beggars. Bloom points to the example of street children in India, who can get many donations because they are adorable but this results in their enslavement by organized crime. Bloom says that though someone might feel better about themselves and  when they give to the person in front of them, in some cases they would do less harm and in many cases do more good in the world by giving to an effective charity through an impersonal website.

Bloom believes improper use of empathy and social intelligence can lead to shortsighted actions and parochialism. 

Bloom says that although psychopaths have low empathy, the correlation between low empathy and violent behavior as documented in scientific studies is "zero". Other measures are much more predictive of violent behavior, such as lack of self-control. People with Asperger syndrome and autism also have low empathy, but are more often the victim of violent attacks than the perpetrators.

Bloom points out that parents who have too much short-term empathy might create long-term problems for their children, by neglecting discipline, helicopter parenting, or deciding not to get their children vaccinated because of the short-term discomfort. People experiencing too much empathy after a disaster may continue to send donations like canned goods or used clothing even after being asked to stop or send cash instead, and this can make the situation worse by creating the need to dispose of useless donations and taking resources away from helpful activities. Bloom also finds empathy can encourage unethical behavior when it causes people to care more about attractive people than ugly people, or people of one's own race vs. people of a different race. The attractiveness bias can also affect wildlife conservation efforts, increasing the amount of money devoted and laws passed to protect cute and photogenic animals, while taking attention away from species that are more ecologically important.

Empathic distress fatigue 
Excessive empathy can lead to "empathic distress fatigue", especially if it is associated with pathological altruism. The  risks are fatigue, occupational burnout, guilt, shame, anxiety, and depression.

Tania Singer says that health care workers and caregivers must be objective regarding the emotions of others. They should not over-invest their own emotions in the other, at the risk of draining away their own resourcefulness. Paul Bloom points out that high-empathy nurses tend to spend less time with their patients, to avoid feeling negative emotions associated with witnessing suffering.

Disciplinary approaches

Philosophy

Ethics 

In the 2007 book The Ethics of Care and Empathy, philosopher Michael Slote introduces a theory of care-based ethics that is grounded in empathy. His claim is that moral motivation does, and should, stem from a basis of empathic response. He claims that our natural reaction to situations of moral significance are explained by empathy. He explains that the limits and obligations of empathy and in turn morality are natural. These natural obligations include a greater empathic and moral obligation to family and friends and to those close to us in time and space. Our moral obligation to such people seems naturally stronger to us than that to strangers at a distance. Slote explains that this is due to the natural process of empathy. He asserts that actions are wrong if and only if they reflect or exhibit a deficiency of fully developed empathic concern for others on the part of the agent.

Phenomenology 
In phenomenology, empathy describes the experience of something from the other's viewpoint, without confusion between self and other. This  the sense of agency. In the most basic sense, this is the experience of the other's body as "my body over there". In most other respects, however, what is experienced is experienced as being the other's experience; in experiencing empathy, what is experienced is not "my" experience, even though I experience it. Empathy is also considered to be the condition of intersubjectivity and, as such, the source of the constitution of objectivity.

History 
Some postmodern historians such as Keith Jenkins have debated whether or not it is possible to empathize with people from the past. Jenkins argues that empathy only enjoys such a privileged position in the present because it corresponds harmoniously with the dominant liberal discourse of modern society and can be connected to John Stuart Mill's concept of reciprocal freedom. Jenkins argues the past is a foreign country and as we do not have access to the epistemological conditions of bygone ages we are unable to empathize with those who lived then.

Psychotherapy 
Heinz Kohut introduced the principle of empathy in psychoanalysis. His principle applies to the method of gathering unconscious material.

Business and management 
In the 2009 book Wired to Care, strategy consultant Dev Patnaik argues that a major flaw in contemporary business practice is a lack of empathy inside large corporations. He states that without empathy people inside companies struggle to make intuitive decisions and often get fooled into believing they understand their business if they have quantitative research to rely upon. He says that companies can create a sense of empathy for customers, pointing to Nike, Harley-Davidson, and IBM as examples of "Open Empathy Organizations". Such companies, he claims, see new opportunities more quickly than competitors, adapt to change more easily, and create workplaces that offer employees a greater sense of mission in their jobs. In the 2011 book The Empathy Factor, organizational consultant Marie Miyashiro similarly argues for bringing empathy to the workplace, and suggests Nonviolent Communication as an effective mechanism for achieving this. In studies by the Management Research Group, empathy was found to be the strongest predictor of ethical leadership behavior out of 22 competencies in its management model, and empathy was one of the three strongest predictors of senior executive effectiveness. A study by the Center for Creative Leadership found empathy to be positively correlated to job performance among employees as well.

Evolution of cooperation 
Empathic perspective-taking plays important roles in sustaining cooperation in human societies, as studied by evolutionary game theory. In game theoretical models, indirect reciprocity refers to the mechanism of cooperation based on moral reputations that are assigned to individuals based on their perceived adherence a set of moral rules called social norms. It has been shown that if reputations  and individuals disagree on the moral standing of others (for example, because they use different moral evaluation rules or make errors of judgement), then cooperation will not be sustained. However, when individuals have the capacity for empathic perspective-taking, altruistic behavior can once again evolve. Moreover, evolutionary models also revealed that empathic perspective-taking itself can evolve, promoting prosocial behavior in human populations.

Measurement 
Efforts to measure empathy go back to at least the mid-twentieth century. Researchers approach the measurement of empathy from a number of perspectives.

Behavioral measures normally involve raters assessing the presence or absence of certain either  behaviors in the subjects they are monitoring. Both verbal and non-verbal behaviors have been captured on video by experimenters such as Truax. Other experimenters, including Mehrabian and Epstein, required subjects to comment upon their own feelings and behaviors, or those of other people involved in the experiment, as indirect ways of signaling their level of empathic functioning to the raters.

Physiological responses tend to be captured by elaborate electronic equipment that has been physically connected to the subject's body. Researchers then draw inferences about that person's empathic reactions from the electronic readings produced.

Bodily or "somatic" measures can be seen as behavioral measures at a micro level. They measure empathy through facial and other non-verbally expressed reactions. Such changes are presumably underpinned by physiological changes brought about by some form of "emotional contagion" or mirroring. These reactions, while they appear to reflect the internal emotional state of the empathizer, could also, if the stimulus incident lasted more than the briefest period, reflect the results of emotional reactions based on cognitions associated with role-taking ("if I were him I would feel...").

Picture or puppet-story indices for empathy have been adopted to enable even very young, pre-school subjects to respond without needing to read questions and write answers. Dependent variables (variables that are monitored for any change by the experimenter) for younger subjects have included self reporting on a seven-point smiley face scale and filmed facial reactions.

In some experiments, subjects are required to watch video scenarios (either staged or authentic) and to make written responses which are then assessed for their levels of empathy; scenarios are sometimes also depicted in printed form.

Self-report measures 

Measures of empathy also frequently require subjects to self-report upon their own ability or capacity for empathy, using Likert-style numerical responses to a printed questionnaire that may have been designed to reveal the affective, cognitive-affective, or largely cognitive substrates of empathic functioning. Some questionnaires claim to reveal both cognitive and affective substrates. However, a 2019 meta analysis questions the validity of self-report measures of cognitive empathy, finding that such self-report measures have negligibly small correlations with corresponding behavioral measures.

In the field of medicine, a measurement tool for carers is the Jefferson Scale of Physician Empathy, Health Professional Version (JSPE-HP).

The Interpersonal Reactivity Index (IRI) is among the oldest published measurement tools still in frequent use (first published in 1983) that provides a multi-dimensional assessment of empathy. It comprises a self-report questionnaire of 28 items, divided into four 7-item scales covering the subdivisions of affective and cognitive empathy described above. More recent self-report tools include The Empathy Quotient (EQ) created by Baron-Cohen and Wheelwright which comprises a self-report questionnaire consisting of 60 items. Another multi-dimensional scale is the Questionnaire of Cognitive and Affective Empathy (QCAE, first published in 2011).

The Empathic Experience Scale is a 30-item questionnaire that measures empathy from a phenomenological perspective on intersubjectivity, which provides a common basis for the perceptual experience (vicarious experience dimension) and a basic cognitive awareness (intuitive understanding dimension) of others' emotional states.

International comparison of country-wide empathy 
In a 2016 study by a US research team, self-report data from the Interreactivity Index (see Measurement) were compared across countries. From the surveyed nations, the nations with the five highest empathy scores were (in descending order): Ecuador, Saudi Arabia, Peru, Denmark, and United Arab Emirates. The lowest scores came from Bulgaria, Poland, Estonia, Venezuela, and Lithuania.

Other animals and empathy between species 

Researchers Zanna Clay and Frans de Waal studied the socio-emotional development of the bonobo chimpanzee. They focused on the interplay of numerous skills such as empathy-related responding, and how different rearing backgrounds of the juvenile bonobo affected their response to stressful events—events related to themselves (e.g. loss of a fight) as well as stressful events of others. They found that bonobos sought out body contact with one another as a coping mechanism. Bonobos sought out more body contact after watching an event distress other bonobos than after their individually experienced stressful event. Mother-reared bonobos sought out more physical contact than orphaned bonobos after a stressful event happened to another. This finding shows the importance of mother-child attachment and bonding in successful socio-emotional development, such as empathic-like behaviors.

Empathic-like behavior has been observed in chimpanzees in different aspects of their natural behaviors. For example, chimpanzees spontaneously contribute comforting behaviors to victims of aggressive behavior in both natural and unnatural settings, a behavior recognized as consolation. Researchers led by Teresa Romero observed these empathic and sympathetic-like behaviors in chimpanzees in two separate  groups. Acts of consolation were observed in both groups. This behavior is found in humans, particularly in human infants. Another similarity found between chimpanzees and humans is that empathic-like responding was disproportionately provided to kin. Although comforting towards non-family chimpanzees was also observed, as with humans, chimpanzees showed the majority of comfort and concern to close/loved ones. Another similarity between chimpanzee and human expression of empathy is that females provided more comfort than males on average. The only exception to this discovery was that high-ranking males showed as much empathy-like behavior as their female counterparts. This is believed to be because of policing-like behavior and the authoritative status of high-ranking male chimpanzees.

Canines have been hypothesized to share empathic-like responding towards human species. Researchers Custance and Mayer put individual dogs in an enclosure with their owner and a stranger. When the participants were talking or humming, the dog showed no behavioral changes; however when the participants were pretending to cry, the dogs oriented their behavior toward the person in distress whether it be the owner or stranger. The dogs approached the participants when crying in a submissive fashion, by sniffing, licking, and nuzzling the distressed person. The dogs did not approach the participants in the usual form of excitement, tail wagging, or panting. Since the dogs did not direct their empathic-like responses only towards their owner, it is hypothesized that dogs generally seek out humans showing distressing body behavior. Although this could suggest that dogs have the cognitive capacity for empathy, it could also mean that domesticated dogs have learned to comfort distressed humans through generations of being rewarded for that specific behavior.

When witnessing chicks in distress, domesticated hens (Gallus gallus domesticus) show emotional and physiological responding. Researchers Edgar, Paul, and Nicol found that in conditions where the chick was susceptible to danger, the mother hen's heart rate increased, it sounded vocal alarms, it decreased its personal preening, and its body temperature increased. This responding happened whether or not the chick felt as if it were in danger. Mother hens experienced stress-induced hyperthermia only when the chick's behavior correlated with the perceived threat. Animal maternal behavior may be perceived as empathy, however, .

Humans can empathize with other species. One study of a sample of organisms showed that the strength of human empathic perceptions (and compassionate reactions) toward an organism is negatively correlated with how long ago our species' had a common ancestor. In other words, the more phylogenetically close a species is to us, the more likely we are to feel empathy and compassion towards it.

In fiction
The power of empathy has become a frequent ability in fiction, specifically in that of superhero media. Users, known as "empaths," have the ability to sense/feel the emotions and bodily sensations of others and, in some cases, influence or control them.

Although sometimes a specific power held by users such as Marvel Comics character Empath, the power has also been frequently linked to that of telepathy such as in the case of Jean Grey.

The rebooted television series Charmed sees the character Maggie Vera as a witch with the power of empathy. Her powers later expand to allow her to control the emotions of others as well as occasionally concentrate emotion into pure energy. In Season 4 she learns to replicate people's powers by empathically understanding them.

See also

References

Further reading

External links 
 
 
 
 
 
 Toward a consensus on the nature of empathy: A review of reviews

 
Cognitive neuroscience
Concepts in ethics
Concepts in metaphysics
Emotions
Interpersonal relationships
Life skills
Moral psychology
Social emotions